There were six badminton events at the 2018 South American Games. The events were held from 26 May to 31 May at the Evo Morales Coliseum in Cochabamba, Bolivia.

Medal table
The table below gives an overview of the medal standings of badminton events at the 2018 South American Games.

Medalists
The table below gives an overview of the medal winners of badminton events at the 2018 South American Games.

Results

Men
Final four

Top half

Bottom Half

Men's doubles

Women

Women's doubles

Mixed doubles

References

External links
 Tournament results at www.cochabamba2018.bo

Badminton
South American Games
2018